Drepana cultraria, the barred hook-tip, is a moth of the family Drepanidae and part of Drepana subgenus Watsonalla. It is found in southern and central Europe.

The wingspan is 20–28 mm. The moth flies from May to August depending on the location.

The larvae feed on Fagus species.

References

External links
"65.003 BF1647 Barred Hook-tip Watsonalla cultraria (Fabricius, 1775)". UKMoths. Retrieved 5 August 2018.
Lepiforum.de

Moths described in 1775
Drepaninae
Drepanid moths of Great Britain
Moths of Europe
Taxa named by Johan Christian Fabricius
Articles containing video clips